Elbers is a surname. Notable people with the surname include:

Dirk Elbers (born 1959), German politician
Ferdinand Elbers (1862–1943), Belgian mechanic, trade unionist and politician
Jef Elbers (born 1947), Belgian singer
Pieter Elbers (born 1970), Dutch airline executive
Stanley Elbers (born 1992), Dutch footballer